Harry Oakes Stubbs  (December 7, 1874 – May 9, 1950) was an English-born American character actor, who appeared both on Broadway and in films.  He was born on December 7, 1874, in Southampton, Hampshire, England.  Stubbs immigrated from England at the age of 16, and made his first Broadway appearance at the age of 31 in The Bad Samaritan, which had a short run of fifteen performances in September 1905 at the Garden Theatre.

The Internet Broadway Database (IBDB) has him appearing in only eight plays over the next 23 years, the last of which was 1928's The Big Fight which had a month run at the Majestic Theatre in September/October 1928.

In 1929, he would move to Hollywood and begin his film career, which spanned the first fifteen years of the sound era of the industry; he would appear in over 50 films during that time. At the beginning of his career in the movies, he would have several leading roles, as in his first film, Alibi, but for the most part he was relegated to the smaller roles of a character actor. Stubbs died on May 9, 1950, at the age of 75.

Filmography 

(Per AFI database) An asterisk denotes a leading or featured role.

Alibi (1929) - Buck Bachman*
The Locked Door (1929) - The waiter
Three Live Ghosts (1929) - Bolton*
The Bad One (1930) - Sailor #2
Ladies Must Play (1930) - Stormfield "Stormey" Button*
Night Ride (1930) - Bob O'Leary*
The Truth About Youth (1930) - Horace Palmer
Millie (1931) - Mark
The Gang Buster (1931) - Faulkner
Her Majesty, Love (1931) - Hanneman
Fanny Foley Herself (1931) - Crosby
Stepping Out (1931) - Tubby Smith
The Man Who Played God (1932) - Chittendon
Girl Without a Room (1933) - Art buyer
The Mind Reader (1933) - Thompson
The Invisible Man (1933) - Inspector Bird
When Strangers Marry (1933) - Major Oliver
All of Me (1934) - Second man in speakeasy
Now and Forever (1934) - Mr. O'Neill
Search for Beauty (1934) - Fat man in bed
Captain Hurricane (1935) - Henry Stone
The Spanish Cape Mystery (1935) - Sheriff Moley*
Thanks a Million (1935) - Campaign manager
It Had to Happen (1936) - Bailiff
Sutter's Gold (1936) - John Jacob Astor*
The White Angel (1936) - Sergeant
The Man I Marry (1936) - Villager
The Girl from Mandalay (1936) - Trevor
Waikiki Wedding (1937) - Keith
On the Avenue (1937) - Kelly
London by Night (1937) - Postman
Love and Hisses (1937)
A Doctor's Diary (1937) - Dr. Walker
In Old Chicago (1938) - Fire commissioner
Peck's Bad Boy with the Circus (1938) - Hank
Doctor Rhythm (1938) - Police captain
I Stand Accused (1938) - Mr. Moss
The Invisible Man Returns (1940) - Policeman
A Dispatch from Reuters (1940) - Board member
Waterloo Bridge (1940) - Proprietor of eating house
Adventure in Diamonds (1940) - Stout man on boat
The Mummy's Hand (1940) - Bartender
Zanzibar (1940) - Alf
Margie (1940) - Butler
Burma Convoy (1941) - Hubert
The Lady from Cheyenne (1941) - Doorman
The Singing Hill (1941) - James Morgan*
The Wolf Man (1941) - Reverend Norman
Eagle Squadron (1942) - Cockney
Sherlock Holmes and the Voice of Terror (1942) - Taxi driver
Ten Gentlemen from West Point (1942) - Senator
Flesh and Fantasy (1943) - Proprietor
Frankenstein Meets the Wolf Man (1943) - Guno

References

External links

 
 
 

1874 births
1950 deaths
British emigrants to the United States
American male stage actors
American male film actors
20th-century American male actors
Burials at Chapel of the Pines Crematory